The mixed team 10 metre air pistol event at the 2019 European Games in Minsk, Belarus took place on 22 June at the Shooting Centre.

Schedule
All times are  local (UTC+3).

Results

Qualification

Stage 1

Stage 2

Finals

References

Mixed team 10 metre air pistol